Lucifer is an American urban fantasy television series developed by Tom Kapinos that premiered on January 25, 2016, and concluded on September 10, 2021. It is based on the DC Comics character created by Neil Gaiman, Sam Kieth, and Mike Dringenberg. The character was introduced in the comic book series The Sandman and later became the protagonist of a spin-off comic book series. Both series were published by DC Comics' Vertigo imprint. The television series was produced by Jerry Bruckheimer Television, DC Entertainment and Warner Bros. Television.

The series revolves around the story of Lucifer Morningstar (Tom Ellis), the DC Universe's version of the Devil, who abandons Hell for Los Angeles where he runs his own nightclub named Lux and becomes a consultant to the Los Angeles Police Department (LAPD). The ensemble and supporting cast include Lauren German as Detective Chloe Decker, Kevin Alejandro as Detective Daniel "Dan" Espinoza, D. B. Woodside as Amenadiel, Lesley-Ann Brandt as  Mazikeen, Rachael Harris as Dr. Linda Martin, and (beginning in season 2) Aimee Garcia as Ella Lopez. Filming took place primarily in Vancouver before production was relocated entirely to Los Angeles beginning with the third season.

The first season received mixed reviews from critics, though subsequent ones were better rated; many critics particularly praised Ellis's performance. Despite initially high viewership for its debut, ratings remained consistently low throughout the series' run on Fox. In May 2018, Fox cancelled Lucifer after three seasons. One month later, Netflix picked up the show where the series continued for a further three seasons, consistently earning high viewership for its tenure on the streaming platform.

Plot
The series focuses on Lucifer Morningstar, a handsome and powerful angel who was cast out of Heaven for his rebellion. As the Devil, Lucifer tires of the millennia he spent being the Lord of Hell, punishing people. Becoming increasingly bored and unhappy with his life in Hell, he abdicates his throne in defiance of his father (God) and abandons his kingdom for Los Angeles, where he runs his own nightclub called Lux.

When he finds himself involved in a murder investigation, he meets the intriguing Detective Chloe Decker. After helping the Los Angeles Police Department (LAPD) solve the case by using his power to manipulate humans into revealing their deepest desires, Lucifer accepts a subsequent invitation to work with Chloe as a consultant to the department, and throughout the series, they encounter all sorts of supernatural beings while solving crimes together and developing their relationship.

Cast and characters

 Tom Ellis as Lucifer Morningstar: Lord of Hell, Lucifer, after becoming bored with his life, abandoning his throne for five years, becomes a civilian consultant for the Los Angeles Police Department while running his own high-end nightclub called Lux. In season 5, Ellis also portrays Lucifer's twin brother Michael, who briefly takes over his brother's identity after Lucifer returns to Hell.
 Lauren German as Detective Chloe Decker: Her late father was an LAPD officer, and she is a homicide detective. She solves crimes with Lucifer, who takes an interest in her upon noticing that she seems to be immune to his abilities.
 Kevin Alejandro as Detective Daniel "Dan" Espinoza: An LAPD homicide detective and Chloe's ex-husband. He develops a complicated friendship with Lucifer as they often butt heads and insult each other, partly due to the fact that Lucifer and Chloe date. 
 D. B. Woodside as Amenadiel: An angel, Lucifer's older brother, and the eldest of all their siblings. He arrives in Los Angeles to encourage Lucifer to go back to Hell, and failing that, he attempts to force Lucifer back in different ways. He has the first half-angel/half-human baby with Linda.
 Lesley-Ann Brandt as Mazikeen: Confidante and devoted ally of Lucifer, "Maze" for short. She is a demon who, having served as his head torturer, follows him from Hell to Los Angeles, and acts as a bartender and bodyguard at Lucifer's club. In the second season, Maze looks for a new direction on Earth and becomes a bounty hunter. She marries Eve in the final season. In the fourth episode of season 5, Brandt also portrays the demon Lilith, Maze's mother and Lucifer's ex-lover.
 Scarlett Estevez as Beatrice "Trixie" Espinoza (seasons 1–4, recurring seasons 5–6): Chloe and Dan's daughter, who befriends Lucifer and Mazikeen.
 Rachael Harris as Dr. Linda Martin: Lucifer's Stanford-educated psychotherapist. In season 4 she gave birth to Charlie (Amenadiel's son) who is considered the first half-angel-half-human baby in the universe and throughout all time.
 Kevin Rankin as Detective Malcolm Graham (season 1): A police officer who was shot prior to the beginning of the series. He briefly died, but then is brought back from Hell by Amenadiel to kill Lucifer.
 Aimee Garcia as Ella Lopez (seasons 2–6): A forensic scientist for the LAPD, originally from Detroit. In season 3, it is revealed that Ella had been regularly visited by Lucifer's sister "Rae-Rae" Azrael, the Angel of Death, after surviving a car crash in her youth. She is known for her bubbly personality and often never-ending optimism and enthusiasm. 
 Tricia Helfer as "Mum" / Goddess (season 2; guest season 5/episode 14) and Charlotte Richards (seasons 2–3; guest season 6) and as Shirley Monroe (guest season 5/episode 4) : Lucifer and Amenadiel's mother and exiled wife of God, who has escaped her prison in Hell. She is described as "the goddess of all creation". On Earth, her soul occupies the body of Charlotte Richards, a murdered lawyer. After she leaves the universe at the end of the second season, the human Charlotte is resurrected. Charlotte is murdered at the end of season 3 by Marcus/Cain. In season 5, Goddess briefly returns from her universe to reunite with God who chooses to retire with Goddess to her universe. In the series finale, Charlotte briefly returns, sharing a meal in Heaven with Dan with whom she had a brief romantic history with prior to her murder.
 Tom Welling as Lieutenant Marcus Pierce / Cain (season 3): A highly respected police lieutenant who oversees the work of Chloe, Dan, and Ella at the LAPD. He is revealed to be the immortal Cain, Adam and Eve's son and Abel's brother. He is the world's first murderer, condemned to wander the Earth forever with the Mark of Cain.
 Inbar Lavi as Eve (season 4; guest season 5; recurring season 6): The world's first female human who recently left Heaven, Cain's mother and former lover of Lucifer. She eventually becomes a bounty hunter and marries Maze.
Brianna Hildebrand as Aurora, aka Rory (season 6): A half-human-half-angel who shows up in Hell and then on Earth seeking vengeance on Lucifer. She absconds to Earth with Dan's soul in an attempt to learn how to kill Lucifer. She is later revealed to be Chloe's and Lucifer's daughter from the future who is enraged with Lucifer for his apparent abandonment of her before she was even born. She has blades instead of feathers in her wings which can hurt Lucifer.

Episodes

In April 2016, Fox renewed the series for a 13-episode second season, which premiered on September 19, 2016. On October 31, 2016, the series received a 9-episode extension for a full 22-episode second-season pickup by Fox. On February 13, 2017, Fox renewed the series for a third season initially consisting of 22 episodes, which premiered on October 2, 2017. However, in March 2017, it was revealed that the final four episodes of the second season would be removed and placed in the third season to air, resulting in the second season consisting of 18 episodes and the third season of 26. On January 22, 2018, writer Chris Rafferty indicated that the third season would instead contain 24 episodes, and the extra 2 episodes would be held for the fourth season.

On May 11, 2018, Fox canceled the series after three seasons, stating it was a "ratings-based decision". The 2 episodes being held for the fourth season would now be seen back-to-back as "bonus episodes" at the end of the third season; they were broadcast on May 28, 2018, as a single two-hour bonus episode.

On June 15, 2018, it was announced that Netflix had picked the series up for a fourth season of ten episodes, which was released on May 8, 2019. On June 6, 2019, Netflix renewed the series for a fifth (and originally final) season of sixteen episodes, in two batches consisting of 8 episodes each. The first 8 episodes were released on August 21, 2020, and the second 8 episodes were released on May 28, 2021. On June 23, 2020, Netflix officially renewed the series for a sixth and final season of 10 episodes, which was released on September 10, 2021.

Production

Development
In September 2014, it was reported that DC and Fox were developing a television series based on the Sandman character Lucifer, as originally written by Neil Gaiman. The series is a "loose adaptation" of the original comic book. In May 2015, the series was officially picked up for 13 episodes for the 2015–16 season. Fox then hired Almost Human alum Joe Henderson as showrunner, with Kapinos remaining on the series in a lesser capacity.

In an interview, actress Lesley-Ann Brandt stated that production for the fifth season was "99% finished," with production all completed except for half of the final episode before suspending production due to the COVID-19 pandemic. Production resumed on September 24, 2020, to finish the final episode of the fifth season and begin production of the sixth season.

Casting
In February 2015, it was announced that Tom Ellis had been cast as Lucifer Morningstar, and that Tom Kapinos would write the pilot, to be directed by Len Wiseman. Approximately one month after, Lauren German was cast as LAPD-detective Chloe Decker. Lina Esco was originally cast as Maze (Mazikeen), however, the role was later recast with Lesley-Ann Brandt. Kevin Alejandro portrayed Dan. In June 2016, it was announced that Tricia Helfer had been cast as Lucifer and Amenadiel's mother, Charlotte, and that she was to appear in multiple episodes in the second season. The character was promoted to series regular in July 2016. Aimee Garcia had also been cast as a regular in the second season, playing L.A.P.D.'s forensic scientist Ella Lopez. In August 2016, executive producer Ildy Modrovich announced the casting of Michael Imperioli as the angel Uriel, Amenadiel and Lucifer's younger brother with "a chip on his shoulder". For the fourth season, Graham McTavish and Inbar Lavi were cast as Father Kinley and Eve respectively. For season 5, Netflix announced the casting of Matthew Bohrer as Donovan Glover, a character who appeared in only one episode.

In February 2020, Netflix and Warner Bros. were reported to have begun talks to renew the show for a sixth season. In March 2020, Tom Ellis and other stars of the series were reported to have signed up for a sixth season. However, a contract dispute led Ellis to not be officially signed on until late May.

Filming
Although the pilot was shot on location in Los Angeles, the rest of the first season and the entirety of the second were filmed in Vancouver, British Columbia, with some exterior filming in Los Angeles. Production relocated to California beginning with the third season, taking advantage of tax incentives provided by the California Film Commission under its "Program 2.0" initiative and spending $92.1 million on production. Season four was also shot on location in Los Angeles, as well as at Warner Bros.' Burbank studio lot, spending $35.8 million on production.

Music
The opening theme is a six-second clip from "Being Evil Has a Price", performed by the band Heavy Young Heathens. In a lawsuit filed against Warner Bros., the song's composers, Robert and Aron Marderosian, claim the song has been used without giving them proper credit or a licensing agreement.

Several episodes include musical performances by Tom Ellis, although he has stated in interviews that while it is his vocals, the piano accompaniment seen on screen is not actually his. Neil Gaiman is a fan of David Bowie, and some of Bowie's music has been used on the series (The illustration of Lucifer in the comics is also based on David Bowie).

Simultaneously with the release of the first half of Season 5, an official soundtrack was released by WaterTower Music, containing cast recordings from all five released seasons.

Release

In its first three seasons, Lucifer aired in the United States on Fox, in 720p, high definition, and Dolby Digital 5.1 surround sound. The first and second seasons aired on Monday at 9 pm ET, before moving to the 8 pm time slot on Monday for the third season. Hulu owned the exclusive streaming rights in the United States, with each season released after its broadcast on Fox but moved over to Netflix in December 2018.

CTV holds the broadcast rights for Canada. In the United Kingdom it aired on the television channel FOX until the channel was cut prior to Season 4. Subsequently Amazon Video holds first-run broadcasting rights, with each episode airing less than 24 hours after the US broadcast. The series aired on FX in Australia before moving to FOX8 during its third season when FX closed and on TVNZ1 in New Zealand.

Beginning August 17, 2022, TNT will be re-running the series.

Reception

Ratings

Following the release of its second half of the fifth season on Netflix, Lucifer was near the top of Nielsen's streaming ratings, garnering 1.8 billion viewing minutes from May 31 to June 6, 2021.

Critical response

The pilot episode was screened in July at the 2015 San Diego Comic-Con. The pilot was met positively by the viewers, with Bleeding Cools Dan Wickline praising the episode, saying "the show itself is enjoyable because of the great dialogue and flawless delivery from its lead" and "This version of Lucifer refuses to take almost anything seriously and the show is better for it."
Max Nicholson of IGN rated the pilot episode a 6.9/10, praising Tom Ellis's performance as Lucifer and the lighthearted tone of the series, but criticizing the series for essentially being another crime procedural series.

The first season received mixed reviews. The review aggregator website Rotten Tomatoes reports that 49% of critics gave it a positive review based on 43 reviews, with an average rating of 5.40 out of 10. The site's critics consensus reads, "Lucifer got sex appeal, but the show's hackneyed cop procedural format undermines a potentially entertaining premise." Metacritic, which uses a weighted average, assigned a score of 49 out of 100 based on 24 critics, indicating "mixed or average reviews".

Critics were much more receptive to the rest of the series. The second season has 100% on Rotten Tomatoes based on 9 reviews, with an average rating of 7.9 out of 10. The site's critics consensus reads, "Tom Ellis continues to shine as the Morning Star [sic], though perhaps he could fly higher if he weren't locked into such a familiar format."

Ed Power of The Telegraph gave the second-season premiere a 4 out 5, stating that "It is entirely beguiled by its own preposterousness." Bernard Boo of We Got This Covered gave the premiere 3.5 out of 5 stars, saying "Lucifer's second season gets off to a nice start, building on the show's strengths while retaining some of the weaknesses. It remains an unapologetically sordid, demonically fun hour of TV." LaToya Ferguson of The A.V. Club gave it a B grade, calling the episode funny with "genuinely funny moments to come from" and saying that the premiere "starts the season off on a good note." She praised Tom Ellis's performance calling it "pitch perfect."

Awards and nominations

Censorship campaign
On May 28, 2015, the American Family Association (AFA) website One Million Moms launched a petition to prevent the series' airing. The petition stated that the series would "glorify Satan as a caring, likable person in human flesh." The petition had 31,312 signatures by the series' premiere date. Posted the same date on the main AFA website, the petition garnered 134,331 signatures by the premiere date. In response to the petition, character creator Neil Gaiman commented on his Tumblr page: 
 Regardless of the campaign, Fox renewed the series in April 2016 for a second season.
The campaign was referred to in a joke in the 2nd season episode "Sympathy for the Goddess". Lucifer is told he is in danger, and asks "Is it the Yakuza? The Nephilim? One Million Moms?"

Cancellation reactions
On May 11, 2018, following the series' initial cancellation, co-showrunner Joe Henderson indicated that the third-season finale would feature a "huge cliffhanger" that was meant to deter Fox from cancelling the series and encouraged fans to "make noise" with the hashtag #SaveLucifer. Fans, as well as the cast and crew, rallied on Twitter and #SaveLucifer soon became the #1 trending topic. A second hashtag, #PickUpLucifer, emerged as a trending topic as well. An online petition also began circulating aimed at renewing Lucifer for a fourth season on a new network. Warner Bros. Television subsequently began shopping the series around to premium cable and streaming services. On June 15, 2018, Netflix picked up the series for a fourth season. The penultimate episode of the fourth season is titled "Save Lucifer" in honor of the campaign.

Arrowverse

Lucifer Morningstar makes a cameo appearance in The CW's Arrowverse crossover event "Crisis on Infinite Earths", which is featured throughout the TV shows Arrow, The Flash, Supergirl, Batwoman, and Legends of Tomorrow. The events of his cameo were five years before the events of Lucifer. The event also retroactively establishes the world of the series as Earth-666, confirms that Lucifer is aware of the multiverse, and elaborates how Mazikeen came to work for him (pre-Crisis) thanks to John Constantine. It is also revealed he has history with Constantine as well.

Explanatory notes

References

External links

 
 

 
2010s American comedy-drama television series
2010s American LGBT-related drama television series
2010s American mystery television series
2010s American police procedural television series
2010s American supernatural television series
2016 American television series debuts
2020s American comedy-drama television series
2020s American LGBT-related drama television series
2020s American mystery television series
2020s American police procedural television series
2020s American supernatural television series
2021 American television series endings
American television series revived after cancellation
Angels in television
Dark fantasy television series
Demons in television
English-language Netflix original programming
Fiction about God
Fiction about purgatory
Fiction about the Devil
Fictional portrayals of the Los Angeles Police Department
Fox Broadcasting Company original programming
LGBT speculative fiction television series
Mythology in popular culture
Occult detective fiction
Religious controversies in television
Religious controversies in the United States
Television controversies in the United States
Television series based on works by Neil Gaiman
Television series by Warner Bros. Television Studios
Television shows based on DC Comics
Television shows featuring audio description
Television shows filmed in Los Angeles
Television shows filmed in Vancouver
Television shows set in Los Angeles
Urban fantasy